FH Serpentis (Nova Serpentis 1970) was a nova, which appeared in the constellation Serpens in 1970. It reached magnitude 4.4. It was discovered on February 13, 1970 by Minoru Honda located at Kurashiki, Japan. Other astronomers later studied this nova, and calculated its distances based on the decay time of its light curves.

Nova Serpentis was also observed by the NASA space observatory OAO-2 Stargazer, active from 1968 to 1973.

The nova was important for science because it was one of the first to be observed in multiple wavelength bands including, infrared, visible, ultra-violet, and radio. One of the observations that stood out was that it became brightest in the infrared 100 days after it was first discovered.

A small emission nebula (shell) is visible around the star, which resembles a planetary nebula.   Santamaria et al. examined images of the nebula taken in 1996 and 2018 and found that the shell is clearly expanding.   It is slightly elliptical, with major and minor axes of 12.4×10.6 arc seconds (as of 2018) expanding at a rate of 0.125×0.109 arc seconds per year, implying a physical expansion rate of 630×540 km/sec.

References

Novae
Serpens (constellation)
1970 in science
Serpentis, FH